The canton of Valentigney is an administrative division of the Doubs department, eastern France. Its borders were modified at the French canton reorganisation which came into effect in March 2015. Its seat is in Valentigney.

It consists of the following communes:
 
Bourguignon
Dambelin
Écot
Feule
Goux-lès-Dambelin
Mandeure
Mathay
Neuchâtel-Urtière
Noirefontaine
Pont-de-Roide-Vermondans
Rémondans-Vaivre
Solemont
Valentigney
Villars-sous-Dampjoux
Voujeaucourt

References

Cantons of Doubs